Evolution is the fifth studio album by American electronica duo Blood on the Dance Floor, released internationally on June 19, 2012. It is their first release to appear on the US Billboard 200, peaking at No. 42, and is their best-selling effort to date.

Background
Evolution is composed of fourteen full songs with four interludes roughly a minute in length each. In a short video uploaded to the duo's official YouTube channel promoting the album, lead singer Dahvie Vanity said the album "represents my blood, sweat, and tears. My entire life and emotions." The album is notable for its collaborations, the opening track "Rise and Shine" featuring rapper Deuce. Other notable collaborations include Joel Madden of Good Charlotte and Amelia Arsenic of Angelspit.

Critical reception

David Jeffries from AllMusic gave the album a mixed review, saying "Evolution is awesome or awful depending on your point of view", and discussed and/or criticized some themes of the album. He picked "Unforgiven", "Frankenstein + the Bride", "Fantasyland", and "The Last Dance" as the album's highlights. Davey Boy from Sputnik Music gave the album a 1.5 (very poor) out of 5, saying "Sure, there has been some gradual growth since their horrid initial output, but improving on Shakespearian lyrics such as 'I'll throw a dildo in your grave, party up and start a rave' and 'My cum's so chunky, it's like an Oreo McFlurry' really isn't all that difficult." He chose Rise & Shine and Hollywood Tragedy as recommended tracks.

Track listing

Personnel
Blood on the Dance Floor

 Dahvie Vanity – clean vocals
 Jayy Von Monroe – vocals, drums, guitar, bass, keys

Charts

References

2012 albums
Blood on the Dance Floor (duo) albums